Road 23 is a road in western Iran. It connects Miandoab to Bijar and Hamadan. The southern part is very important and touristic. Because it connects Hamadan to Alisadr Cave. It is about 60 kilometers from Hamadan to Alisadr Cave.

References

External links 

 Iran roads map on Young Journalists Club

23
Transportation in West Azerbaijan Province